(often referred to as Verbindung) is the umbrella term for many different kinds of fraternity-type associations in German-speaking countries, including Corps, and Catholic fraternities. Worldwide, there are over 1,600 , about a thousand in Germany, with a total of over 190,000 members. In them, students spend their university years in an organized community, whose members stay connected even after graduation. A goal of this lifelong bond is to create contacts and friendships over many generations and to facilitate networking. The  is very important for the longevity of these networks.

Their autonomous and grassroots democratic  is also an important similarity of all student corporations.

Fraternities of this particular type are present in Germany, Austria, Switzerland, Belgium, Hungary, Latvia, Estonia, (formerly) German or German-speaking areas and other smaller communities in Europe, and Chile.

Organization 

Studentenverbindungen consist of active members who are students currently enrolled at a university, and the graduated Alte Herren or Altherren (Elder Gentlemen or alumni) / Hohe Damen (High Ladies) that were once active in these corporations and now provide guidance and the necessary financial backing.

The active students are commonly divided into four groups: the new, first year , the loose associate , the Burschen (German for fellow, full members), and the inactive Burschen (having been members for a set time limit, usually three or four semesters) forming the fraternity's active core.

The fourth group, the Chargen are Burschen elected by the former groups' democratic vote and entitled to decide over certain situations of everyday fraternity life. Common Chargierte are the Senior (signing his name with an x at the end e.g. Mustermann Z! x), Consenior (xx) and the Drittchargierter, or often also called Scriptor (xxx). The Senior's task is mainly to represent the fraternity to the outside and to lead it. The Consenior assists the Senior but mainly focuses on imparting the fencing practice, the organization of fraternity events and the constant contact to fellow female students. Whilst the Drittchargierter is in charge of mail correspondence, finance and diplomacy. Another Function often referred to as a Charge (Chargierter) is the so-called Fuchsmajor.

One of the many benefits of joining a fraternity in Germany is the especially low pricing of the often high-quality rooms. Because Studentenverbindungen are much less prevalent in campus life in comparison to US fraternities, some actively try to recruit new members through these low-priced rooms. After a certain period, the Fuchsenzeit, these new members have the opportunity to learn the traditions. After successful completion of all necessary tests and examinations they are usually accepted as full members.

Once finished with higher education and having started a career, the inactive Burschen are asked to resign from the fraternity's core members and become Alte Herren or Philister. This involves losing influence in active fraternity life and in voting in the core fraternity's democratic process, allowing younger generations to take their place. Major decisions, though, are still made by an annual Convent where every member, student or not, has at least one vote; the Alte Herren Commission (short AHC) which represent all Alte Herren usually have double votes and veto rights. They also take care of the financial overview and supervising the Verbindungshaus.

Furthermore, all Alte Herren are commonly asked to pay a certain annual sum to help sustain the fraternity fiscally, to actively participate in democratic decisions concerning only Alte Herren, and to pay regular visits to the fraternity's festivities.

A notable characteristic of this structure is that the relationship between active members and Alte Herren is usually so close that even the youngest members are asked to address even their most decorated Alte Herren by Du, the intimate form of addressing someone in German, or even by their first names. This commonly includes referring to one another as "Verbindungs-bruder" (Brother). As it is possible for any Verbindung to forge treaties with another, this may also be extended to members of other fraternities. This relationship between the old and the young allows young members to learn how to bear responsibilities themselves.

Mensur 

To laymen, the most well-known tradition of Studentenverbindungen is the Mensur, a special form of very strictly regulated, fixed-stance fencing ritual. The Mensur is practised with sharp blades, and although the body is well-protected, it allows for deep (cosmetic) facial and cranial wounds, which often result in a scar which is called Schmiss. The Schmiss was once regarded as the passport to a better future, because the Mensur strives to educate physical and mental strength by exposing the combatants to a rare and extreme situation. In modern times, opinions differ, although the principle stays the same: whereas one would formerly engage in a Mensur to be hit, many fencing students of today will rather engage in combat in order to prove their competence by not being wounded, instead focusing on reinforcing the bond between members of the fraternity. Some fraternities that do not practice academic fencing have other rituals that are meant to substitute this ritual of group dynamics, such as extreme hiking.

While the Mensur is the most central principle to some Verbindungen, especially of the Corps, Burschenschaften and Landsmannschaften, these organizations require their members to fence with each other. Other Verbindungen allow their members to fence voluntarily, but the majority of these now forbid their members to fence. In particular, Christian fraternities decline the Mensur from general ethical perspectives, with Catholic fraternities even being formally restricted on the ground of the 5th commandment "You shall not kill", which includes the integrity of the God-given body in general.

Hallmarks

Couleur 

Visually, the most discerning characteristic of many Studentenverbindungen is the so-called Couleur, which can consist of anything from a small part of ribbon worn over the belt, to elaborate uniforms with riding boots, sabers, and colorful cavalry jackets, depending on circumstances and tradition. Most commonly, a thin sash displaying (usually) three distinctive colors is worn in everyday life, this is called Band. Although this display was common in the past (Wilhelmine Period) it is not as common at German universities anymore.

Color-wearing ("farbentragend") Studentenverbindungen are those whose members that wear a Band a headwear with their fraternities colors.
Many Burschenschaften wear the color combination Black-Red-Gold as a historical symbol for German unity. These colors were first worn by the Urburschenschaft in 1815.
There are also color-carrying or -bearing ("farbenführend") Verbindungen, while their members do not wear a sash their colors are often represented in their uniforms and other Couleur, like flags.

In fraternity documents, members sign their names with a  after their signature.
 have their origin in abbreviations, by student orders of the 18th century, to show their affiliation in written documents. Today,  are often used on clothing or other personal items.

Many fraternity members can be identified through their , or by less obvious codes such as a certain style of dressing, e.g. Timberland boots and polo shirts.

Coat of arms 

Studentenverbindungen's coats of arms do not strictly follow heraldic rules, their use started around the year 1800.
The escutcheon is often divided in four, Burschenschaften's most commonly by a cross. These fields are filled with various non heraldic symbols, for example with the fraternity's colors, the Zirkel, allusions to their university or city and other regional heraldic elements, also symbols for friendship and eternity, that are taken from Freemasons and antiquity.

Kneipe 

More elaborate uniforms are usually worn at a Kneipe or, more formally, Commers, a kind of gathering only still preserved at Studentenverbindungen. Such events can happen regularly but specially during holidays, for example to celebrate Christmas, to commemorate a deceased Verbindungs-brother, or in remembrance of historic events or important dates in the fraternity's history e.g. the founding day of the fraternity (Stiftungstagskneipe). During these gatherings, the crowd of members and guests present are presided over by the Chargierte (see above), with the Senior conducting the gathering, executing certain rituals, from as simple as welcoming guests, holding speeches to performing the so-called Landesvater ("father of the country"). The latter is a ceremonial where a sabre is pierced through the Couleur-bearing headgear of the participants in a complex ritual, accompanied by a ceremonial chant. While such rituals are only performed on the most solemn of occasions and thus very rare, a Kneipe commonly involves the lighter sides of life, such as rampant beer consumption and uninhibited singing of traditional student songs, of which some can be bawdy for the standards of time. Thus, this allows to get to know otherwise daunting members on a personal level due to the relaxed atmosphere at these gatherings.

History

Early history 
When the first universities formed in Paris, Bologna, and Salerno around the 12th century, Europe was divided into a large number of small states, which reflected itself in the composition of the student body. To ensure an equal influence on the university's decisions, the students and teachers began to form nationes, with one nation for each native state of its members. This basic tradition was continued for a long time and still survives in Sweden and Finland to the present day.

When the first universities of the Holy Roman Empire were founded in Prague (1348), Vienna, and Heidelberg in the 14th century, they established a similar system, the Burse (From Latin "bursa" meaning "coin purse", from which Bursche stems, for the Burse's collective funds). Students were forced to live in a dorm assigned by their native state and soon started taking up formal signs, often colorful clothing, to display their membership in a Burse. This continues in the colored sashes worn by modern Studentenverbindungen. When the first duels were fought is not known exactly, because students were allowed to carry épées or sabers to be able to protect themselves and to deal with confrontations between rival groups (Raufduell).

In the 17th century, the respective sovereigns gained increasing control over "their" Burse, and the first fraternities were formally formed, calling themselves Landsmannschaften, giving themselves Latin names according to their country of origin (Borussia for Prussia, Guestphalia for Westphalia, etc.) and introducing Fuchs and Bursche as status designations. Lifelong membership, though, was not known. During this period, the regulated duel was developed, accompanied by the idea to defend one's honor with a weapon and a strict code to guide the confrontation. This potentially lethal tradition continued until 1933 in Germany, with being so strict at some points, that e.g. a Prussian officer could be expelled if he was not willing to demand or give satisfaction.

As the Landsmannschaften faded during the early 1800s, secret organizations known as Studentenorden (student orders) took their place and introduced elaborate rituals, formal oaths of membership, a strict constitutio to regulate internal behavior, and cryptic symbols to identify members. All of these traditions are still known and actively practised in today's fraternities. The Studentenorden, though, were heavily monitored by the then-absolutist government, as many of their traditions were derived from freemason or Illuminati lodges, and were subsequently banned at the end of the 18th century.

Early 19th century 
As Studentenorden were dissolved and their former members sought a possibility to continue their traditions, they began rebuilding a similar form of community under the then-common and insuspicious French word "Corps". Symbols, oaths, regulations and rituals were continued from Studentenorden tradition (although the secrecy was omitted for longevity's sake), and the Latin names, status designations and affiliation with a country of origin were copied from the now-extinct Landsmannschaften.

A new characteristic was the heavy influence of German idealism, in particular the works of Kant and Fichte. This resulted in a strong focus on forming young members to be strong, upright and honorable, in order for the nation's "best and brightest" to spread these ideas throughout society. Political, especially geopolitical activities of Corps as a whole were actively discouraged, as social commitment was seen as more promising and less controversial. Another characteristic was to unify all of a city's, and ultimately Germany's, Corps under an umbrella organization and to vote on common rules and principles for each Corps to abide by. Hence the KSCV was created in 1848. The oldest, still existing Studentenverbindung, Corps Guestphalia Halle established in 1789, was a founding member.

Burschenschaft and rebellion against aristocracy 

The Corps soon saw themselves heavily confronted by the Burschenschaft, which was first founded in 1815. Sparked by the nationalist sentiment after the Napoleonic Wars, the members of the latter perceived the traditional forms of fraternities, who were still heavily affiliated with their state of origin, to be reactionary and elitist. Thus, they organized themselves into what was pictured as a single fraternity spanning all states of German language, allowing the students to coordinate a nationalist revolution; i.e. a revolution to unify Germany and to abolish all princedoms. From the beginning, they were a dedicated political organization, in contrast to the Corps.

This early attempt failed in 1819 when the Burschenschaft was fragmented, but the sentiment prevailed. At this occasion, the modern German colors are mentioned for the first time in popular culture, in the seventh verse of August Daniel von Binzer's song "Wir hatten gebauet ein stattliches Haus", citing the colors of the Burschenschaft:
Das Band ist zerschnitten,
war schwarz, rot und gold,
und Gott hat es gelitten,
wer weiß was er gewollt!
The ribbon is cut,
t'was black, red and gold,
and God suffer'd it,
who knows what his intent!

Karlsbad Decrees 
In the same year, due to general antisemitism prevalent in any social class, massive antisemitic protests, mainly fueled by students, craftsmen and traders, (see Hep-Hep riots) swept the German-speaking states, injuring and killing many. As a result, by the Karlsbad Decrees, any self-regulating student body was forcibly dissolved, severe censorship and punishments were instituted, and government authority was significantly increased.

This resulted in secret gatherings and smaller revolutionary acts, many of which are seen as the foundation for a German nation in today's world, such as the Hambach festival in 1832, where the German colors flew as a flag for the first time, and the Frankfurter Wachensturm in 1833, a failed attempt to take a large city's treasury to fund a revolution.

Revolution of 1848 and subsequent diversification 

Tensions started to build, with short lived, illegal fraternities forming, being dissolved and reforming at all universities, peaking in the German revolution of 1848 in which many members of Studentenverbindungen took part. Although the unification of Germany, according to the principles of the Burschenschaft soon failed violently, the Studentenverbindungen had emancipated themselves, and many of the members of the first Frankfurt parliament were in fact Corps students or Burschenschaft members.

Thus, the general concept flourished quickly, and soon, the Studentenverbindungen were no longer seen as clubs of young rowdies and revolutionaries, but as a valuable school for the future. This allowed Alte Herren to identify with the active members of their fraternities, and the idea of a lifelong commitment arose (Lebensbundprinzip). Soon, the first Stiftungsfeste, annual festivities in celebration of the fraternity's founding, were celebrated, further cementing their standing. As increased liberty allowed it, a more regulated form of duel was conceived: The modern Mensur, which strived to reduce lethality rates while still being able to fence. The former objective, though, was greatly impaired by treatment possibilities, with infected wounds posing a substantial risk.

During this time, the first Christian fraternities were established by religious students missing belief as a basic principle of unity. Although some of them still took up weapons, many refused to do so from an ethical and religious standpoint. They often carried generic names, unifying themselves under an umbrella organization such as the oecumenical Wingolf (with Wingolf Bonn being the first in 1841).

When the Catholic religion was beginning to be repressed during the Kulturkampf, a large number of fraternities of Catholic belief were formed as a reaction. The first organization of decidedly Catholic origin was the Schweizerische Studentenverein ("Swiss students' union") in 1841. These catholic fraternities understood themselves as an important network to counteract the Kulturkampf.

In 1848, a Germany-wide association of Corps was founded in Bad Kösen, the so-called Kösener Senioren-Convents-Verband, KSCV, (roughly, "the Kösen association of the committees of the first men in charge"). It consisted solely of the old Corps present at traditional liberal arts colleges and excluded those at technical colleges. In reaction, the Weinheimer Senioren Convent, WSC, was established, which unified the latter. Today, the two umbrella organizations are tightly linked by a cooperation treaty, known as Die Corps.

The types of fraternities soon diversified, and formerly informal clubs, such as sports clubs influenced by the political ideas of Turnvater Jahn (Turnerschaften), academic choirs (Sängerschaften), and groups influenced by the progressive movement (Landsmannschaften after the 17th century organizations) were reorganized. Each with their namesake as their central principle and idea of character building. Landsmannschaft Sorabia-Westfalen Münster is the oldest Studentenverbindung of modern constitution. It was founded in 1716 in the City of Leipzig.

A notable exception from these self-centered principles is the VVDSt (Verband der Vereine Deutscher Studenten, "union of associations of German students"), which had a strict antisemitic policy and was formed in 1881 as a decidedly political group. As a reaction, the first Jewish fraternities were established in the 1880s, prevailing until the National Socialist regime. Theodor Herzl, the founder of zionism and a former Burschenschaft student, was soon made an honorary member in many of these fraternities. Furthermore, Jewish fraternities were heavily focused on emancipating themselves through duel and Mensur.

Finally, around the break of the century, women were admitted to visit universities, unifying to sororities in 1899. The first such organization was the Club der Namenlosen ("club of the nameless"), that was soon renamed to Verein Studierender Frauen Deutschlands Hilaritas ("association of female students of Germany Hilaritas").

This diversification progressed to the point that the formerly despised students' culture heavily influenced society, especially affecting the language. During the Wilhelminian Era, this development peaked, with the largest part of the academic community (active or alumni) being member in one or more of the over 1300 fraternities and even non-members cutting themselves with razors to simulate the appearance of the characteristic fencing wounds. As of today, Bismarck and Kaiser Wilhelm II still remain the most well-known of Corps students and German fraternity students in general.

First World War, Weimar Republic and National Socialist rule 
This lasted until the first World War, which called all of the active students to serve their country, which many welcomed euphorically. Fatalities substantially reduced the number of fraternity students and students in general. When the war was lost and the Kaiser was forced to step down and hand over the power of state to a democratic government, the fraternities' world shook in its foundations.

The violence the students had experienced at war, the uncertainty of the Weimar Republic times and the deeply felt humiliation of the harsh conditions of the Peace of Versailles caused many fraternity members to enlist in the newly founded Freikorps, paramilitary organizations thought to protect democracy. As open battles between Freikorps members and communist activists began, many quickly radicalized throughout society, resulting in formerly non-political fraternities developing an extreme nationalist, anti-communist and antisemitic standpoint. As this was a fertile ground for the newly founded NSDAP to flourish on, many soon committed themselves to its principles, with some, such as the Burschenschaft, expelling Jews as early as 1920.

When the NSDAP seized power in 1933, many rejoiced, although it was soon made clear that Studentenverbindungen would not be allowed to persist. There are several exceptions, though, most notably the Corps Saxo-Borussia, whose members loudly discussed on different occasions if "the fuehrer were to eat his asparagus with his knife, his fork, or his paws", coming to the conclusion that he had "so large a gab, he would be able to eat it crosswise".

This led to all Studentenverbindungen being classified as "reactionary", and most of them either dissolved themselves or were forcibly closed during 1934 to 1938. The former members were then reorganized in Kameradschaften ("comradeships") and forced to omit their principles of democratic vote, lifelong cooperation, honor and tradition. In secrecy, though, many of the former customs were still practised, although with the outbreak of World War II, few remained to do so during the war.

Post-war times 
After the war, the remaining former members soon tried to reorganize themselves, often fusing two or more Verbindungen to allow for greater impact, such as Guestphalia Bonn (West Germany) and Guestphalia Greifswald (East Germany). Although this was at first made illegal by the occupation forces and universities, they slowly gained a foothold in society again (see Corps Suevia). Special influences on this include several court decisions, amongst which are the decision that the Mensur does not violate moral code in 1951, that public display of fraternity colors can not be punished by expulsion from the university (1958, so called "Freiburg color dispute") and the forced acceptance of the last fencing fraternity in Berlin in 1968, and the formal obligation to head of state Theodor Heuss to abolish duels for honor.

One side effect is that, due to this persistent struggle back to acceptance through legal action and sheer will of survival, post war fraternities in Germany, unlike their pre-war selves, did not receive any university funding, but had also become completely free and independent of University regulation or oversight.

While this allowed for progress and such was achieved during the 1950s and early 1960s, the Verbindungen again took a hard hit in 1968 with the general socialist sentiment amongst the student movement and their desire to abolish anything deemed reactionary. As of today, many of the prejudices then expressed still form the base of what little is known to the public about Verbindungen, resulting in a slow and steady decline in membership count since. A notable upswing was only delivered by the recent Bologna process, depriving students of long known means of studying and thus increasing the demand for assistance by experienced alumni. , a bit less than 1% of German university students are active members of a Studentenverbindung.

The most prospering Studentenverbindungen can still be found in cities and towns with traditional liberal arts colleges and universities like Göttingen, Bonn and Heidelberg in Germany, with Munich being an exception. Traditional structures have mostly been preserved, with rituals, codes of honor, symbols and principles still intact. Most Studentenverbindungen still are restricted to only one gender, with the male varieties actively practising the Mensur. However, many have formally repented their presumed mistakes, with memorials of unjustly excluded Jews, for instance, being a common sight in a Verbindungshaus.

Controversy 

There are numerous points of critique which are usually discussed without result. The most common include accusations of nationalism, racism, sexism and elitism.
 Nationalism: Based on the historical background of many Verbindungen, especially Burschenschaften, having either a strong link to a former princedom or having displayed strong nationalism before these were abolished, the accusation of nationalism is the most frequent, to the harm of the other Verbindungen.
 Racism: With long histories of white supremacy and antisemitism, today's Verbindungen are often said to be prone to structural racism. Supporters, on the other hand, often argue that the evidence is largely anecdotal. The Burschenschafts criterion of only admitting males "of German culture" often draws criticism, as well. However, the majority of Verbindungen, especially Corps, define themselves as tolerant in general, regardless of race, ethnicity or national origin.
 Sexism: As the majority of Studentenverbindungen are male-only, left-wing student organizations in particular often raise allegations of sexism. This is often combined with the accusation of being elitist, as it restricts women from making use of the same lucrative career networks as males. There is a long list of female-only Verbindungen however, with a historic background reaching to 1898, whilst the oldest still active Verbindung was founded in 1976.
 Elitism: Alte Herren are said to take care of the students' careers, helping them in their subjects of study and in other areas of life, up to organizing good jobs and opportunities after graduation. This networking is seen as problematic by other students and most students' unions. Today's fraternities dismiss this as a stereotype stemming from the Wilhelminian Era, when fraternities were much more common and a career was near-impossible without their help.

Apart from debate, these accusations have led to numerous acts of politically motivated violence, with over 100 cases in 2010 alone, ranging from simple vandalism such as destroying windows and spraying graffiti, through aggravated assault, to arson endangering fraternity members.

Common types 
Despite a wide variety of Studentenverbindungen, certain kinds are more common:

Notes: wc=wearing couleur; nc=not wearing couleur; pF=practicing academic fencing; fo=academic fencing optional; nF=not practicing academic fencing

Uncommon, but influential are the academical-technical engineering clubs ("Akademischer Verein") of the Hütte and Miltenberg-Wernigeroder Ring; the "Hütte" is the publisher of one of the major engineering compendiums in Germany.

See also

Umbrella organizations of fraternities 
Corps:
 Kösener Senioren-Convents-Verband and website: Kösener Senioren-Convents-Verband (KSCV)
 Weinheimer Senioren-Convent and website: Weinheimer Senioren-Convent (WSC)
Burschenschaften:
 Deutsche Burschenschaft (DB)
 Neue Deutsche Burschenschaft (NDB)
Others:
 Coburger Convent der akademischen Landsmannschaften und Turnerschaften (CC)
 Kartellverband katholischer deutscher Studentenvereine (KV)
 Cartellverband der katholischen deutschen Studentenverbindungen (CV)
 Wingolfsbund (WB)
 Katholiek Vlaams Hoogstudentenverbond (KVHV)
 Nationalistische Studentenvereniging (NSV) (Flemish)
 Schweizerischer Studentenverein (StV-SES)

References

Further reading
 U. Altermatt (ed.), Den Riesenkampf mit dieser Zeit zu wagen... Schweizerischer Studentenverein 1841-1991. Maihof-Verlag, Luzern, 1993, 
 Rolf-Joachim Baum (Hrsg.), "Wir wollen Männer, wir wollen Taten!" Deutsche Corpsstudenten 1848 bis heute, Siedler-Verlag, Berlin 1998, 
Martin Biastoch: Duell und Mensur im Kaiserreich (am Beispiel der Tübinger Corps Franconia, Rhenania, Suevia und Borussia zwischen 1871 und 1895). SH-Verlag, Vierow 1995, 
Martin Biastoch: Tübinger Studenten im Kaiserreich. Eine sozialgeschichtliche Untersuchung, Sigmaringen 1996 (Contubernium – Tübinger Beiträge zur Universitäts- und Wissenschaftsgeschichte vol. 44) 
Martin Biastoch: Die Corps im Kaiserreich – Idealbild einer Epoche?. In: "Wir wollen Männer, wir wollen Taten" – Deutsche Corpsstudenten 1848 bis heute, Rolf Joachim Baum (ed.), Siedler Verlag, Berlin 1998, pp. 111–132.
Edwin A. Biedermann, "Logen, Clubs und Bruderschaften", Droste-Verlag, 2007, 2nd ed., 415 pages
 Paulgerhard Gladen: Gaudeamus igitur - Die studentischen Verbindungen einst und jetzt, Cologne 2001 (in German),
 Jonathan Green: Armed and Courteous, Financial Times, 3 January 2004, p. 16. online (JPG-Scans)
 Edgar Hunger / Curt Meyer: Studentisches Brauchtum, Bonn, Stuttgart 1958 (German)
 Peter Krause: O alte Burschenherrlichkeit - Die Studenten und ihr Brauchtum, 5th improved ed., Graz, Wien, Cologne 1997 (in German), 
 Manfred Studier: Der Corpsstudent als Idealbild der Wilhelminischen Ära – Untersuchungen zum Zeitgeist 1888 bis 1914, Abhandlungen zum Studenten- und Hochschulwesen, vol. 3, Schernfeld 1990, 
 R. G. S. Weber: The German Corps in the Third Reich Macmillan London, German edition: Die Deutschen Corps im dritten Reich SH-Verlag 
 Marc Zirlewagen (ed.): Wir siegen oder fallen - Deutsche Studenten im Ersten Weltkrieg, Cologne 2008 (in German),

External links 
 Schweizerischer Studentenverein
 German website of "Landsmannschaft Ulmia Tübingen"
 English website of Corps Borussia

Austrian culture
Swiss culture
German words and phrases